Glenham is a town in South Dakota, United States. 

Glenham may also refer to:

 Glenham, New York, United States
 Glenham Hotel (935–939 Broadway), New York, United States
 Glenham Branch (Wyndham Branch), New Zealand

See also 
 Glemham